The Kleine Heidelberger Liederhandschift ("Small Heidelberg Song-manuscript") is a collection of Middle High German Minnesang texts. In Minnesang scholarship it is referred to as MS. A. It is held by the Heidelberg University Library with the signature Cod.Pal.germ. 357 (Cpg 357).

Along with the Weingarten Manuscript (MS. B) and the Codex Manesse (MS. C), it is one of the major sources of Minnesang texts from the beginnings (around 1150) to the end of the "golden age" (around 1230).

Description
Dating from 1270–1280, it is the oldest of the three Upper German Minnesang manuscripts. It was created in Alsace, possibly in Strassburg. There is no certainty about the patron, though Conrad of Lichtenberg, Bishop of Strassburg has been suggested.

It contains 45 parchment pages in small format (18.5 x 13.5cm), hence its name, which distinguishes it from the larger format Große Heidelberger Liederhandschrift ("Great Heidelberg Song-manuscript"), as the Codex Manesse is often called, which is held in the same library. 

The main part of the manuscript is written by a single scribe and the language is Low Alemannic. The appendix, the work of five different scribes, shows some Central German influence. The manuscript is written in Gothic minuscule. The songs are written in a single column, the beginnings indicated by paragraph marks. The individual strophes are indicated by blue and red Lombardic capitals, some of which are elaborate. Unlike the Codex Manesse it has no miniatures showing the poets.

Content

The songs themselves date from the central period in the development of Minnesang. The earliest are probably those of Heinrich von Rugge (around 1180) while the latest, dating to around 1240, are the songs of Neidhart von Reuental and Bruder Wernher. 

The main part of the manuscript is divided into 34 sections or author names; the material in the appendix is anonymous. Four or five of these authors are represented in each of two collections under a slightly modified name, thus about 30 authors are distinguished. The number of songs for each poet ranges from two (Reinmar der Junge) to 151 strophes (Walther von der Vogelweide).

The appendix consists of 56 verses without names and initials. They can be attributed to known poets on the basis of other manuscripts.

The Poets

Named sections

1r Reinmar der Alte
4v Reinmar der Fiedler
5r Reinmar der Junge
5v Walther von der Vogelweide
13v Heinrich von Morungen
15r Ulrich von Singenberg, Truchseß zu St. Gallen
20v Rubin
21v Niune
24v Geltar
26r Neidhart
27r Spervogel
28r Der junge Spervogel
29r Rudolf von Rotenburg
29v Heinrich von Rugge
30r Hartmann von Aue
30v Wolfram von Eschenbach
30v Wachsmut von Künzingen
31r Rudolf von Rotenburg
31r Walther von Mezze
32r Gottfried von Straßburg
32r Heinrich von Veldeke
32v Markgraf von Hohenburg
33r Heinrich von Veldeke
33v Hawart
34v Günther von dem Forste
35v Graf Heinrich von Anhalt
36r Albrecht von Johansdorf
36r Markgraf von Hohenburg
36v Bruder Wernher
36v Leuthold von Seven
39r Hugo von Mühldorf (Kunz von Rosenheim?)
39r Burggraf von Regensburg
39r Otto von Botenlauben

Anonymous texts
40r Rubin 
40v Walther von der Vogelweide
40v Rubin 
41r Walther von der Vogelweide 
42r Reinmar von Zweter
42v Ulrich von Liechtenstein / von Wissenloh / Anonymous a 
43r Reinmar der Alte / Anonymous a 
43v Friedrich von Sonnenburg 
44r Pseudo-Friedrich von Sonnenburg 
45r Rubin

Notes

References

External links
 Digital facsimile

14th-century books
Poetry anthologies
Middle High German literature
Middle High German manuscripts
Minnesang
German anthologies